Several ships of the Chilean Navy have been named Prat or Capitán Prat after Arturo Prat, commander of the Chilean ship  during the War of the Pacific

 , a ship ordered by Chile but finally purchased by Japan
  (1890)
 
 

See also
 Capitan Prat (disambiguation)

Chilean Navy ship names